Iaco River is a river of Acre and Amazonas states in western Brazil.

See also
List of rivers of Acre
List of rivers of Amazonas (Brazilian state)

References
Brazilian Ministry of Transport

Rivers of Acre (state)
Rivers of Amazonas (Brazilian state)